Bhupen Lalwani (born 7 April 1999) is an Indian cricketer. He made his first-class debut on 11 January 2020, for Mumbai in the 2019–20 Ranji Trophy.

References

External links
 

1999 births
Living people
Indian cricketers
Mumbai cricketers
Place of birth missing (living people)